Kulon may refer to:

 Kulon language, an extinct language of the Taiwanese aboriginal people
 Klaudia Kulon (born 1992), Polish chess player

See also
 Kulon Progo Regency, a regency in, Yogyakarta Special Region, Indonesia
 Ujung Kulon National Park, a national park in Banten, Indonesia